Sooke Lake is a natural lake and the main reservoir of Greater Victoria in British Columbia, Canada. It is owned and operated by the Capital Regional District and supplies water to approximately 350,000 people. It has a usable water supply of 92.7 million cubic meters, of a total of 160.32 million cubic meters. Rithet Creek is the main inflow and makes up approximately 25% of the supply.

History 
The development of Sooke Lake as a reservoir was approved in 1910, and construction began in 1912. A concrete dam was constructed and raised the water level . Water was transported to the city of Victoria via the Sooke Flowline, a  concrete aqueduct. The project was completed in 1915.

See also 
Sooke Flowline
Timeline of the Greater Victoria Water System

References 

Lakes of Vancouver Island
Malahat Land District